The 2012 FIBA Europe Under-20 Championship for Women Division B was the eighth edition of the Division B of the Women's European basketball championship for national under-20 teams. It was held in Klatovy, Czech Republic, from 16 to 26 August 2012. Greece women's national under-20 basketball team won the tournament.

Participating teams

  (15th place, 2011 FIBA Europe Under-20 Championship for Women Division A)

  (16th place, 2011 FIBA Europe Under-20 Championship for Women Division A)

Final standings

Results

References

2012
2012–13 in European women's basketball
International youth basketball competitions hosted by the Czech Republic
FIBA U20
August 2012 sports events in Europe